Dargaville ( or ) is a town located in the North Island of New Zealand. It is situated on the bank of the Northern Wairoa River in the Kaipara District of the Northland region. The town is located 55 kilometres southwest of Whangārei. Dargaville is 174 kilometres north of Auckland.

It is noted for the high proportion of residents of Croatian descent. The area around it is one of the chief regions in the country for cultivating kumara (sweet potato) and so Dargaville is known by many locals as the Kumara Capital of New Zealand.

History and culture

The town was named after timber merchant and politician Joseph Dargaville (1837–1896). Dargaville was founded in 1872, during the 19th-century kauri gum and timber trade; it briefly had New Zealand's largest population.

Dargarville was made a borough in 1908.

The area became known for a thriving industry that included gum digging and kauri logging, which was based mainly at Te Kōpuru, several kilometres south of Dargaville on the banks of the Northern Wairoa river.  The river was used to transport the huge logs downstream to shipbuilders and as a primary means of transport to Auckland. Dalmatian migrants were particularly prominent in the kauri gum extraction.  After the gum and forestry industries started to decline after 1920, farming, especially dairy became a significant contributor to the economy.

The Wairoa River was the main method of transport around Dargaville until the 1940s. 

Horses last raced at the Dargaville racecourse in 2016. A proposal in 2022 was submitted to redevelop the racecourse into 450 homes. This private plan change was accepted by the Kaipara Council and released for public consultation in July 2022.

The Bank of New Zealand closed its Dargaville branch in 2020.

Demographics
Statistics New Zealand describes Dargaville as a small urban centre.

Dargaville had a population of 4,794 at the 2018 New Zealand census, an increase of 543 people (12.8%) since the 2013 census, and an increase of 339 people (7.6%) since the 2006 census. There were 1,812 households, comprising 2,325 males and 2,469 females, giving a sex ratio of 0.94 males per female. The median age was 44.1 years (compared with 37.4 years nationally), with 936 people (19.5%) aged under 15 years, 840 (17.5%) aged 15 to 29, 1,785 (37.2%) aged 30 to 64, and 1,233 (25.7%) aged 65 or older.

Ethnicities were 70.7% European/Pākehā, 35.7% Māori, 7.4% Pacific peoples, 4.4% Asian, and 1.4% other ethnicities. People may identify with more than one ethnicity.

The percentage of people born overseas was 13.3, compared with 27.1% nationally.

Although some people chose not to answer the census's question about religious affiliation, 41.1% had no religion, 43.9% were Christian, 3.9% had Māori religious beliefs, 0.9% were Hindu, 0.4% were Muslim, 0.1% were Buddhist and 1.1% had other religions.

Of those at least 15 years old, 282 (7.3%) people had a bachelor's or higher degree, and 1,161 (30.1%) people had no formal qualifications. The median income was $22,200, compared with $31,800 nationally. 267 people (6.9%) earned over $70,000 compared to 17.2% nationally. The employment status of those at least 15 was that 1,440 (37.3%) people were employed full-time, 549 (14.2%) were part-time, and 171 (4.4%) were unemployed.

Geography

The nearby Ripiro Beach has the longest unbroken stretches of sand beach in New Zealand, and is largely drivable from one end to the other. This beach is home of the famous local shellfish delicacy called the toheroa. Overexploitation in the 1950s and 1960s caused the population of the shellfish to decline enough that public gathering of the shellfish is now prohibited.

Dargaville is also the gateway to the Waipoua Forest, a protected national park and home of the biggest specimens of Kauri tree in New Zealand, Tāne Mahuta (Māori, meaning "Lord of the Forest") being chief amongst them.

Dargaville is situated by the Wairoa River, with boat moorings adjacent to the town centre.  The river is tidal when it passes through Dargaville.

Climate
Köppen-Geiger climate classification system classifies its climate as oceanic (Cfb) with warm summers and mild winters.

Infrastructure

Hospital 
Dargaville hospital is located at 77 Awakino Road. It provides a 12 bed general medical ward, a 4 bed post-natal maternity unit. It also provides emergency, radiology, laboratory, physiotherapy, occupational therapy, social work and district nursing services . An eight bed detoxification ward is also located on site. Doctors from Whangārei Hospital also run outpatient clinics at Dargaville hospital.

Road 
Dargaville is on the junction of State Highways 12 and 14.

Rail 
North of the town, the Donnellys Crossing Section railway was established to provide access to other logging activities.  The first portion of this line was opened in 1889, it reached its greatest extent in 1923, and after operating isolated from the national rail network for decades, it was connected with the North Auckland Line by the Dargaville Branch in 1940. The Donnelly's Crossing Section closed in 1959, but the Dargaville Branch remains in use by a tourist venture, having had freight services withdrawn by KiwiRail since October 2014.

Air 
The Dargaville aerodrome is located on the banks of the Northern Wairoa River just south of the town of Dargaville.

Farming 
The area around Dargaville is now predominantly a farming region and supports extensive dairy, beef, and sheep farms, as well as a thriving plantation forest industry. The Silver Fern Farms meat processing plant is located on Tuna Street. It employed 300 staff in 2021.

Amenities 
The Kai Iwi lakes are 25 kilometres north of the town, and the Pouto Peninsula is located to the south of Dargaville.

Beach 
Baylys Beach is the local beach, just 13 kilometres from the township, and offers over 90 kilometres of rugged west coast surf.

Swimming pool 
The Kauri Coast community swimming pool is located at 8 Onslow Street. The 50 metre outdoor swimming pool was built in 2010 at a cost of $6 million and was damaged in 2011 with a large bulge and crack in the middle of it as a result of removing the weight of the water.

Golf course 
The Northern Wairoa Golf Club is located at 819 Baylys Coast Road. The golf course provides sea views throughout its 18 holes. The fairways are lined with pohutakawa trees and there are no bunkers.

Government 
The Kaipara District Council provides local government services for Dargaville. They are located at 32 Hokianga road. The Northland Regional Council provides regional government services for Dargaville. They also operate out of the same building at 32 Hokianga road which cost $9.2 million and opened in 2022. Dargaville is part of the Northland electorate for  the New Zealand parliament.

Culture

Dargaville museum 
The Dargaville Museum Te Whare Taonga o Tunatahi is located in Harding Park (32 Mt Wesley Coast Road, Dargaville). The museum focuses on local history including exhibitions of Maori history, early European pioneers, industrial and maritime history. Exhibits include a 16 meter long Māori Waka and a display hall showcasing the history of the Gum diggers The museum also has a research library and archives. 

The former Aratapu public library building is part of the Dargaville museum exhibition space. This building is listed as a category 2 historic place with Heritage New Zealand and was built in 1874. The building was relocated to Harding Park and restored by volunteers. It was built in a neo-classical style made from timber. It previously served as a school house, a library and a post office.

Dargaville library 
The Dargaville library is located at 71 Normanby street.

Muddy Waters gallery 

The Dargaville Arts Association repurposed the Dargaville Municipal Chambers as an art gallery called the Muddy Waters Gallery.

Marae 
Te Houhanga Marae and Rāhiri meeting house is a traditional meeting place for Te Roroa and the Ngāti Whātua hapū of Te Kuihi and Te Roroa.

Theatre 
The Dargaville Little Theatre is an amateur theatre company located at 241 Victoria Street. Many shows have been put on at the theatre.

Cinema 
The ANZAC Theatre is located at 37 Hokianga Road. It opened in 2013. Prior to 2013, Dargaville did not have a cinema for more than 30 years. The cinema is based in the library space in the former War Memorial Town Hall.

Notable buildings

Holy Trinity church 

The Holy Trinity church is an Anglican church that was built around 1878. It was designed by Edward Mahoney & Sons architectural practice. The church is a listed with Heritage New Zealand as a category two historic place.

River road historic area 
Nine houses (7 to 27 River road) are listed with Heritage New Zealand as a historic area. Marriner house (61 River road) is also listed as a category two historic place being built in 1845. The Commercial Hotel (73-77 River road) and cottages at 143 River road and 145 River road are also category two historic places.

Education
Dargaville High School is a secondary (years 9–13) school with a roll of  students. The school opened in 1921, but was destroyed by fire in 1937 and rebuilt the following year. Dargaville Intermediate is an intermediate (years 7–8) school with a roll of  students.

Dargaville Primary School and Selwyn Park School are contributing primary (years 1–6) schools with rolls of  students and  students respectively. Dargaville Primary was established by 1877. In 1879, it had a roll of 16, which grew to 155 in 1899. Selwyn Park celebrated its 50th Jubilee in 2008.

St Joseph's School is a full primary (years 1–8) school with a roll of  students. It is a state integrated Catholic school.

All these schools are coeducational. Rolls are as of 

NorthTec polytechnic also has a campus in Dargaville.

Notable people

 Amelia Batistich, writer, was born here in 1905
 Joey Carbery, Irish international rugby union player
 Robert Hornblow (1861–1937), the town's mayor from 1919 to 1925
 Dion Nash, New Zealand cricketer, attended Dargaville High School
 Louis Parore, Māori leader, interpreter, land court agent, born at Te Houhanga Marae, Northland
 Mike Perjanik, musician, record producer and composer
 Winston Peters, New Zealand politician and leader of the New Zealand First party, attended Dargaville High School
 Lana Searle, New Zealand radio & television host, attended Dargaville High School
 Mark Taylor, All Black
 Frank Watkins, World War II RNZAF pilot
 Mark Williams, singer and recording artist
 Brian Froggatt, New Zealand Paralympian athlete and powerlifter
 Richard Hammond, musician, bass player.

See also

 Croatian New Zealanders

Notes

External links

 Dargaville online portal

 
Kaipara District
Populated places in the Northland Region
Croatian-New Zealand culture
Croatian diaspora